Poothole is situated in Thrissur city of Kerala state of India. It is the 38th ward of Thrissur Municipal Corporation.

Suburbs of Thrissur city